Vladislav I or Vladimareïo/ Vila·Dumas of the Basarab dynasty, also known as Vlaicu or Vlaicu-Vodă, was the Voivode of Wallachia between 1364 and 1377. He was the son of Nicholas Alexander of Wallachia and Clara Dobokai. 

In February 1369, Vladislav I subdued Vidin and recognised Louis I of Hungary as his overlord in return for Severin, Amlaș, and Făgăraș. In 1373 Louis I took Severin again but Vladislav I recovered it in 1376–1377.

Family

Vladislav I was the son of Nicholas Alexander of Wallachia and Clara Dobokai. It has been suggested that his son was Vlad I of Wallachia.

Reign

During his reign, the Metropolis of Muntenia and Dobrudja was split in two parts, as a single bishop didn't suffice for the entire country, thus creating the Metropolis of Oltenia. The first monasteries in Wallachia were erected by Nicodemus of Tismana (Vodița Monastery and Tismana Monastery) with the support of the voivode.

Relations with the Hungarian Crown

Louis assembled his armies in Temesvár (now Timișoara in Romania) in February 1365. According to a royal charter that year, he was planning to invade Wallachia because the new voivode, Vladislav I, had refused to obey him. However, he ended up heading a campaign against the Bulgarian Tsardom of Vidin and its ruler Ivan Sratsimir, which suggests that Vladislav I had in the meantime yielded to him. Louis seized Vidin and imprisoned Ivan Stratsimir in May or June.In 1366, Louis granted the Banate of Severin and the district of Fogaras to Vladislav Vlaicu of Wallachia, who had accepted his suzerainty. Tvrtko I of Bosnia also accepted Louis's suzerainty after Hungarian troops assisted him in regaining his throne in early 1367. In 1368, Vladislav I made an alliance with Ivan Shishman, a half-brother of the former ruler of Vidin, Ivan Sratsimir. Their united armies imposed a blockade on Vidin. Louis marched to the Lower Danube and ordered Nicholas Lackfi, Voivode of Transylvania, to invade Wallachia in the autumn of 1368. The voivode's army marched through the valley of the Ialomița River, but the Wallachians ambushed it and killed many Hungarian soldiers, including the voivode. However, Louis' campaign against Wallachia from the west was successful and Vladislav Vlaicu yield to him in next summer. Upon his initiative, Louis restored Ivan Stratsimir in Vidin.

Coinage

Vladislav I was the first Wallachian voivode to mint local coins around 1365. The coins were made exclusively from silver and they were classified in 3 categories:

I - Ducats, with a diameter of 18-21mm and an average weight of 1,05 grams.
II - Dinars, with a diameter of 16-18mm and an average weight of 0,70 grams. They looked the same as type III ducats and also featured the same Cyrillic or Latin inscriptions, however they were smaller and lighter.
III - Bans, with a diameter of 14-16mm and an average weight of 0,35 grams.

References

|-

Year of birth missing
1377 deaths
Rulers of Wallachia
 
House of Basarab
People associated with Koutloumousiou Monastery